Dean is a South Korean alternative R&B singer-songwriter and record producer. His discography as a singer consists of 1 extended play and 25 singles (including 11 as lead artist). Since 2015, Dean has sold more than 4.9 million digital songs in South Korea as a lead artist. He has also written songs for multiple artists including Exo, VIXX, and Block B.

Extended plays

Singles

As a lead artist

As a featured artist

Other charted songs

Music videos

Production

Notes

References

Discographies of South Korean artists
K-pop discographies